Primitivo Martínez (24 September 1912 – 19 May 1985) was a Filipino basketball player who competed in the 1936 Summer Olympics and in the 1948 Summer Olympics.

References

External links
 

1912 births
1985 deaths
People from Ormoc
Olympic basketball players of the Philippines
Basketball players at the 1936 Summer Olympics
Basketball players at the 1948 Summer Olympics
Philippines men's national basketball team players
Filipino men's basketball players
UST Growling Tigers basketball players